Sanchez is a populated place situated in Graham County, Arizona, United States.

References

External links
 Sanchez – ghosttowns.com

Ghost towns in Arizona
Populated places in Graham County, Arizona